Adnan Sabri (born 1 January 1966) is a Pakistani former cricketer. He played two first-class cricket matches between 1984 and 1987.

References

External links
 

1966 births
Living people
Pakistani cricketers
Karachi cricketers
Pakistan Automobiles Corporation cricketers
Cricketers from Rawalpindi